British dark comedy refers to a British comedy containing gloomy or disturbing elements. Two of the most successful British dark comedies are The League of Gentlemen and One Foot in the Grave, coming in at number 41 and number 10 respectively in the BBC Britain's Best Sitcom poll.

TV shows

1990s
Brass Eye
If You See God, Tell Him
One Foot in the Grave
Murder Most Horrid

2000s
 Fun at the Funeral Parlour
 Catterick
 Garth Marenghi's Darkplace
 Human Remains
 Ideal
 Jam
 The League of Gentlemen
 Monkey Dust
 Nighty Night
 Psychoville
 Snuff Box
 The Life and Times of Vivienne Vyle

2010s
A Touch of Cloth
Getting On
Black Mirror
Hunderby
Misfits
Inside No. 9

See also
 Black humour
 British comedy

References

British television comedy